Wernberg-Köblitz is a market town in the district of Schwandorf in Bavaria, Germany.

History
The first mention of Wernberg Castle dates to 1280 when Konrad of Paulsdorfer bought the building. Later the castle became a possession of the noble Notthafft family.

References

Schwandorf (district)